Pinzolo (Lombard: Pinsöl) is a small town and comune situated in Val Rendena in Trentino in the northern Italian Alps at an elevation of . The Church of Saint Vigilius of Trent stands in the town.

It is mainly known as a ski resort during the winter months and as a popular touristic destination in the summer.

In January 2017 Valentino Rossi became Honorary Resident of the town.

See also
Sarca

References

External links
Official website